The Shady Hill Historic District is a historic district roughly bounded by Museum, Beacon and Holden, and Kirkland Streets, and Francis Avenue in Cambridge, Massachusetts.  The district encompasses a residential area that is one of the city's most homogeneous neighborhoods of the second half of the 19th century.  Located just east of the Harvard University campus, the area is characterized by large lot sizes and winding roads, with mature trees providing shade.  The houses in the district are predominantly Queen Anne and Colonial Revival in character.

The district was added to the National Register of Historic Places in 1986.

See also
National Register of Historic Places listings in Cambridge, Massachusetts

References

Historic districts in Middlesex County, Massachusetts
National Register of Historic Places in Cambridge, Massachusetts
Historic districts on the National Register of Historic Places in Massachusetts